"Fame (The Game)" was the fourth and final single from Donna Summer's 2008 studio album Crayons. The song was written by Summer and Toby Gad, and produced by Gad. It was released on November 19, 2008 by Burgundy. It reached No. 1 on the Billboard Hot Dance Club Play chart.

Charts

Weekly charts

Year-end charts

See also
List of number-one dance singles of 2009 (U.S.)

References

2008 singles
Donna Summer songs
Songs written by Donna Summer
Songs written by Toby Gad
2008 songs
Dance-pop songs